James Gregory Frugone (October 23, 1897 – June 7, 1972) was an American football tailback who played one season with the New York Giants of the National Football League. He played college football at Syracuse University and attended Commercial High School in Brooklyn, New York. Frugone and high school teammate, Paul Jappe, played together at Syracuse, and also on the 1925 New York Giants.

References

External links
Just Sports Stats

1897 births
1972 deaths
American football running backs
Syracuse Orange football players
New York Giants players
Sportspeople from Brooklyn
Players of American football from New York City